The first season of Dominican reality television series, The Voice Dominicana, premiered on 4 July 2021, on Telesistema 11. Juan Magán, Milly Quezada, Nacho and Musicólogo The Libro were announced as coaches for the first season. Luz García and Jhoel López co-presented the show.

Coaches and hosts 

On 7 October 2020, it was announced that Luz García was the presenter of the show. Jhoel López is the season's second presenter, as the social media correspondent.

On 8 October 2020, three coaches of the show were announced with them being Juan Magán, Milly Quezada and Nacho. Musicologo The Libro was the final coach announced during the grand launch of the show.

Teams

Blind auditions

 The coaches performed "Con Tu Voz" during the premiere of the show.

Battles 
The recordings of the battles were done on the last week of July and premiered on August 29. The advisors for this season were Yiyo Sarante for Team Magán, Johnny Ventura for Team Milly, Miriam Cruz for Team Nacho, and Mark B. for Team Musicólogo. In this round, each coach pairs two team members to perform together and then chooses one to advance in the competition. The coaches also have the power to steal one contestant from another team in the whole round.

Knockouts 
The knockouts started being broadcast on Sunday, September 26. After the battles, each coach had eight contestants for the knockouts. The episodes featured two knockout pairings from each team. Each contestant sang a song of their own choice, and after each pairs' performances concluded, one is chosen by their coach to advance for the live shows.

Live shows

Live Shows (October 10 & 17)

Semi-final (October 24)

Grand Finale (October 31)

Elimination chart

Color key 
Artist's info

  Team Musicólogo
  Team Nacho
  Team Milly
  Team Magán
 

Result details

  Winner
  Runner-up
  Third place
  Fourth place
  Saved by the public
  Eliminated

Overall

References 

Television shows set in the Dominican Republic
Dominican Republic

External links 
 Official Website